The following railroads merged to form the Norfolk Southern Railway.

The Southern Railway changed its name to the Norfolk Southern Railway on December 31, 1990.
The Norfolk and Western Railway was leased by the Southern Railway on December 31, 1990, and merged into the Southern in 1997.
The New York, Chicago and St. Louis Railroad (Nickel Plate Road) merged into the Norfolk and Western Railway on October 16, 1964.
The Wheeling and Lake Erie Railway was leased by the New York, Chicago and St. Louis Railroad on December 1, 1949 and merged into the Norfolk and Western Railway on September 16, 1988.
The Akron, Canton and Youngstown Railway was leased by the Norfolk and Western Railway on October 16, 1964 and merged January 1, 1982.  Its remaining lines were spun off to the new Wheeling and Lake Erie Railway on May 17, 1990.
The Pittsburgh and West Virginia Railway was leased by the Norfolk and Western Railway on October 16, 1964, but was leased to the new Wheeling and Lake Erie Railway on May 17, 1990.
The Wabash Railway was leased by the Norfolk and Western Railway October 16, 1964 before becoming a wholly owned subsidiary of the Norfolk & Western in December 1991. In 1997, the Wabash was merged into NS along with its parent, the N&W.
The Virginian Railway merged into the Norfolk and Western Railway on December 1, 1959.

Other companies:
Alabama Great Southern Railroad
Atlanta and Charlotte Air-Line Railway
Atlantic, Mississippi and Ohio Railroad
Central of Georgia Railroad
The Georgia and Florida Railroad merged into the Central of Georgia Railway June 1, 1971.
The Savannah and Atlanta Railway merged into the Central of Georgia Railway in 1971.
City Point Railroad
East Tennessee, Virginia and Georgia Railway
Georgia Pacific Railway
Illinois Terminal Railroad
Lawrenceville Branch Railroad
Memphis and Charleston Railroad
Norfolk and Petersburg Railroad
Norfolk Southern Railway (1942–1982)
North Carolina Railroad
North Eastern Railroad (Georgia)
Orange and Alexandria Railroad
Piedmont Railway
Piedmont Air-Line Railway
Rabun Gap Short Line Railway
Richmond and Danville Railroad
Richmond and West Point Terminal Railway and Warehouse Company
Richmond and York River Railroad
Shenandoah Valley Railroad
South Side Railroad
Virginia and Tennessee Railroad

References
Norfolk Southern merger family tree, Trains

 
Norfolk Southern predecessor railroads